Koshary, kushari or koshari is Egypt's national dish and a widely popular street food. A traditional Egyptian staple, mixing pasta, Egyptian fried rice, vermicelli and brown lentils, and topped with a zesty tomato sauce, garlic vinegar and garnished with chickpeas and crispy fried onions. It is often served with sprinklings of garlic juice; garlic vinegar and hot sauce are optional.

History
In the Egyptian Books of Genesis, the Ancient Egyptian term "Koshir" meant "Food of the rites of the Gods", the Koshir was a breakfast dish that consisted of lentils, wheat, chickpeas, garlic and onions cooked together in clay pots. The word isn't related to the Jewish dietary laws known as Kosher. It was described by a priest from Heliopolis as a food to eat after fasting on the 11th day of Pachons, a month in the ancient Egyptian calendar. Koshary is known as "The food of the Poor", it consists of fried onions, lentils, rice, macaroni and lemon sauce. It is somewhat related to Mediterranean cuisine, but the Egyptian dish has different ingredients and flavors, especially the local Egyptian lemon sauce, which gives it the unique taste for which the dish is popular.

In 1853, in his book "Journey to Egypt and the Hijaz", explorer Richard Burton documented koshary as the breakfast meal of the people of Suez. It consisted of Egyptian lentils, rice, butter, onions and pickled lemons.

Koshary used to be sold on food carts in its early years, and was introduced to restaurants later.

This dish is widely popular among workers and laborers and the dish is well-suited to mass catering events such as conferences. It may be prepared at home, and is also served at roadside stalls and restaurants all over Egypt; some restaurants specialize in koshary to the exclusion of other dishes, while others feature it as one item among many. As traditionally prepared koshary does not contain any animal products, it can be considered vegan, as long as all frying uses vegetable oil.

Variants 
Alexandrian koshary is quite different from other koshary recipes, with significant variations in taste and form. the process of cooking includes yellow lentils and rice, it also uses curry and cumin in the rice, which gives the koshary a uniform color. Also included are Egyptian rolled eggs, which are boiled then fried in ghee or butter, as well as lightly pickled tomatoes instead of tomato sauce and French fries on the side.

Koshary has also gained popularity outside of Egypt in recent years, especially in Eastern Arabia and Yemen. There are variations in each country or region, such as adding grilled vegetables and using basmati rice cooked either white or yellow. Other recipes of these regions include using other shapes of macaroni. The recipes could include chicken as well, making them closer to kabsa in some cases.

The dish is served in Japanese carts and has some additions added on top of the original recipe. Additional ingredients, which are not typically found in Egyptian recipes, are basil chicken, raw tomatoes, sour cream, fried eggs, Cheddar sauce, avocado slices, and spicy powder with jalapeño.

Instant koshary is similar to instant noodles in preparation.

See also
 List of Middle Eastern dishes

 Ful medames

References

External links

 

Egyptian cuisine
National dishes
Vegan cuisine 
Rice dishes
Macaroni dishes
Lentil dishes
 
Middle Eastern cuisine
Mediterranean cuisine
Egyptian culture
North African culture
African cuisine